This series of lists pertains to food and beverages popular in American breakfast. In the United States, breakfast often consists of either a cereal or an egg-based dish. However, pancakes, waffles, toast, and variants of the full breakfast and continental breakfast are also prevalent.

American breakfast foods

B 
 Bacon
 Bacon, egg and cheese sandwich 
 Bagel and cream cheese
 Bear claw
 Biscuit
 Biscuits and gravy
 Bread pudding
 Breakfast cereal
 Breakfast sausage

C 
 Cereal
 Cinnamon Rolls

D 
 Danish
 Doughnut

E 
 Éclair
 Eggs
 Egg sandwich
 Eggs Benedict
 Energy bar
 English muffin
 Egg McMuffin

F 
 French toast
 Fried eggs
 Frittata
 Fritter
 Fruit
 Fruit salad

G 
Granola
Grits

H 
 Ham
 Hard-boiled egg
 Hash browns
 Home fries
 Huevos rancheros

I 
 Instant breakfast

K 
 Kolache

M 
 Malt-O-Meal
 McGriddle
 McMuffin
 Muesli
 Muffin

O 
 Oatmeal
 Omelette
 Orange

P 
 Pancake
 Poached egg
 Pop-Tart
 Protein bar
 Peanut butter

Q 
 Quiche

R 
 Raisin bread

S 
 Sausage
 Sausage gravy
 Scone
 Steak and eggs
 Sticky bun
 Strata
 Strudel
 Smoothie

T 
 Toast
 Toaster Strudel
 Turnover
 Tart

W 
 Waffle

Y 
 Yogurt

Popular toppings on American breakfast foods 
 Blueberries
 Butter
 Cinnamon
 Compote
 Cottage cheese
 Cream cheese
 Honey
 Hot sauce
 Jam
 Jelly
 Maple syrup
 Margarine
 Marmalade
 Nutella
 Peanut butter
 Pineapples
 Powdered sugar
 Salsa
 Strawberries

Popular American breakfast beverages 
 Chocolate milk
 Coffee and other coffee beverages
 Hot chocolate
 Horchata
 Juice
 Milk
 Orange juice
 Protein shake
 Soy milk
 Tea
 Tomato juice

Regional & old-fashioned American breakfast foods 
 Beignet
 Brown Bobby
 Chicken and waffles
 Cornmeal mush
 Creamed eggs on toast
 Dutch baby
 Fruit pizza - a fruit dessert consisting of a sugar cookie dough "crust", a cream cheese spread, sliced fruit, and a sugary glaze
 Goetta
 Hash
 Hoppel poppel - a German-inspired dish known for using up leftovers, including eggs, potatoes, onions, meats, herbs, and/or veggies
 Huevos rancheros
 Jersey Breakfast
 Scrapple
 Migas
 Popcorn cereal - consumed by Americans in the 1800s, consisting of popcorn with milk and a sweetener.
 Shrimp and grits

References

Breakfast Foods
Breakfast